Lunatics and Lovers is a 1976 Italian comedy film directed by Flavio Mogherini.

Cast
 Marcello Mastroianni as Marquis Luca Maria
 Lino Toffolo as Agostino
 Claudia Mori as Luca Maria's wife
 Adriano Celentano as Sprint Boss
 Flora Carabella as Aunt Luisa
 Anna Miserocchi as Helga
 Olga Bisera as Ivana, the Barman
 Andrea Aureli as The Deputy

See also    
 List of Italian films of 1976

References

External links

1976 films
Italian comedy films
1970s Italian-language films
1976 comedy films
Films directed by Flavio Mogherini
1970s Italian films